Keur Momar Sarr Arrondissement is an arrondissement of the Louga Department in the Louga Region of Senegal. The capital lies at Louga city.

Subdivisions
The arrondissement is divided administratively into rural communities and in turn into villages.

Arrondissements of Senegal
Louga Region